Håkon Olai Kyllingmark (19 January 1915 – 12 August 2003) was a Norwegian military officer and businessman. He served as a politician for the Conservative Party and was elected to the Norwegian Parliament.

Biography
He was born at Kjelvik in Finnmark, Norway. His parents were Martin Kyllingmark (1879-1916) and Sigridur Sæmundsdottir (1892-1963).
He received an education at the Army Command School in 1934 and the Flyvåpen Flying School in 1937. He had a career in the Norwegian Armed Forces between in 1940 and 1943–1945. He rose to the rank of captain in 1944 and major in 1945–1954. He had been a member of Milorg during the German occupation of Norway, and received the Defence Medal 1940–1945.

Kyllingmark was a principally of the  wholesale company H. Kyllingmark A / S from 1945 to 1965. He was involved in local politics in Svolvær from 1945 to 1947 and 1951 to 1963. He was elected to the Norwegian Parliament from Nordland in 1954, and was re-elected on six occasions. From August to September 1963 he was Minister of Defence during the short-lived centre-right cabinet Lyng. While he held this position Moy Herborg Regina Nordahl took his seat in parliament. He was later Norwegian Minister of Transport from 1965 to 1971 during the cabinet Borten. His seat was filled by Bodil Aakre, Leif Kolflaath and Andreas Grimsø alternately.

References

External links

1915 births
2003 deaths
People from Finnmark
Norwegian Army personnel
Norwegian Army Air Service personnel of World War II
Norwegian resistance members
Norwegian non-fiction writers
Shot-down aviators
Members of the Storting
Government ministers of Norway
Conservative Party (Norway) politicians
Nordland politicians
Ministers of Transport and Communications of Norway
20th-century Norwegian politicians
Recipients of the St. Olav's Medal
20th-century non-fiction writers
Defence ministers of Norway